Fahad Meqbel Al-Rashidi  (born June 8, 1991) is a Saudi football player who plays a midfielder for Al-Riyadh.

References

1991 births
Living people
Saudi Arabian footballers
Al Nassr FC players
Al-Orobah FC players
Al-Faisaly FC players
Al-Raed FC players
Khaleej FC players
Al Jeel Club players
Al-Riyadh SC players
Place of birth missing (living people)
Saudi Professional League players
Saudi First Division League players
Saudi Second Division players
Association football midfielders